The Meghalaya Legislative Assembly election of 2008 took place in a single phase on 3 March 2008 to elect the Members of the Legislative Assembly (MLA) from each of the 60 Assembly Constituencies (ACs) in Meghalaya, India. Counting of votes happened on 7 March 2008 and because of the use of Electronic Voting Machines (EVMs) in this election, the results were ready within the day.

The ruling coalition Meghalaya Democratic Alliance (MDA) had broken apart in the lead-up to this election, forcing the main partner Indian National Congress (INC) to take on their erstwhile partners including United Democratic Party (UDP) and Meghalaya Democratic Party (MDP) who had decided to fight against the INC on the basis on corruption charges against the incumbent Government.

The election provided a hung verdict and both the incumbent INC and the post-election coalition of NCP-UDP (who called themselves the Meghalaya Progressive Alliance (MPA) staked claim with the Governor of Meghalaya M.M. Jacob to form the next Government of Meghalaya. By virtue of being the single largest party in this election, winning 25 of the total 60 seats, the incumbent Chief Minister D. D. Lapang of the INC was invited by the Governor to form the new Government on 10 March 2008. However, the Lapang Government was unable to get enough support in the Meghalaya Legislative Assembly and the Chief Minister resigned 9 days later ahead of the vote of confidence scheduled for 20 March 2008. The Governor then invited the head of the UDP Donkupar Roy to form the Government with the support of the MPA coalition who claimed support of 31 of the 60 seats in the Assembly. This included 14 seats from NCP, 11 from UDP, 2 from Hill State People's Democratic Party(HPDP), 1 from Bharatiya Janata Party (BJP), 1 from Khun Hynniewtrep National Awakening Movement (KHNAM) and 2 independents

Background
The previous elections to the 7th Meghalaya Legislative Assembly was held in 2003 and the term for this Assembly was set to expire on 10 March 2008. Hence, the Election Commission of India (ECI) announced fresh elections to the 8th Meghalaya Legislative Assembly on 14 January 2008. Of the 60 ACs in Tripura, 55 are reserved for Scheduled Tribes. Elections in all polling stations were held using EVMs.

After the 2003 elections to the 7th Meghalaya Legislative Assembly, the INC led MDA formed the Government under the leadership of INC's D. D. Lapang. The members of the MDA were INC (22 seats), UDP (9 seats), Meghalaya Democratic Party (MDP) (4 seats) and 3 independents. By 2006, Lapang faced revolt within the INC and the party took the decision to replace him as the Chief Minister. On 15 June 2006, Lapang resigned and his protégé J. D. Rymbai was sworn in as the new Chief Minister by the Governor of Manipur S. S. Sidhu, who administered the oath of office on behalf of Governor M. M. Jacob who was on leave. However, the conflict within the INC did not end there and both Lapang and Rymbai continued to claim majority support among the Congress Legislative Party (CLP). After 8 months in control of the Government, Rymbai was asked by the Congress high command to resign. Lapang was reelected as the leader of the Meghalaya CLP and was reinstated as Chief Minister by Governor M. M. Jacob on 10 March 2007. This time Lapang held onto the post until the completion of the term of the 7th Meghalaya Assembly.

Campaign
In this election the INC was battling not just the Bharatiya Janata Party (BJP), but also its former MDA partners UDP and MDP. In addition, the NCP, a United Progressive Alliance (UPA) partner at the Centre, was also contesting against the INC in Meghalaya. Under the leadership of P. A. Sangma (who gave up national politics in favour of state politics before the elections), the NCP was expected to provide the most stiff competition to the INC.

Elections in the constituency of Baghmara were postponed to 22 March 2008 on count of the death of the sitting INC MLA S. Sangma.

A total of 331 candidates contested the remaining 59 seats up for election. Romgram had the toughest fight with 11 contestants, while Jaiaw had only 2 contestants.

Election Day
Election Day (3 March 2008) was largely peaceful across the state. However, there was one incident of violence that claimed the life of an INC worker when clashes broke out between supporters of INC & NCP at Selsella in the Garo Hills area of the state.

Voter turnout of 89.05% was a record for the state. High voter turnout was reported from almost all rural constituencies. Voter turnout for the Baghmara seat on 22 Mar 2008 was 88.50%.
Combined voter turnout across the state was 89.44%.

Results

Note: The above results are only for 59 seats. The results of Baghmara constituency is not included as elections in Baghmara were postponed.

Elected Members

References

External links
 Election Commission of India
 Government of Meghalaya
 Meghalaya Legislative Assembly

2008 State Assembly elections in India
State Assembly elections in Meghalaya
2000s in Meghalaya